Alexander Borisovich Gradsky (born Alexander Borisovich Fradkin, 3 November 1949 – 28 November 2021) was a Russian rock singer, bard, multi-instrumentalist and composer. He was one of the earliest performers of rock music in Russia. His diverse repertoire included rock 'n' roll, traditional folk songs performed with a rock twist, and operatic arias. He composed two rock operas and numerous songs including soundtrack music for several films.

Early life and musical beginnings
Alexander Gradsky was born on 3 November 1949 in the Russian city of Kopeysk, into a family of mixed Jewish and Russian origin.  His father Boris Fradkin was an engineer working in a factory, and his mother Tamara was an actress. His mother encouraged him to learn to play the violin as a child, and her brother, Boris Gradsky, Alexander Gradsky's uncle, was a dancer who toured abroad with the famous Moiseev dance group and brought home records of Western music artists including Elvis Presley, Louis Armstrong and Little Richard.  Such music was not ordinarily available in Soviet Russia at that time.

By the age of 12, Gradsky was singing Elvis Presley songs and accompanying himself on guitar. In 1963, at the age of 13, he sang with a Polish student band called Tarakany (Тараканы – The Cockroaches) in a concert at the International Club of Moscow State University. This is believed to have been the first public performance of rock 'n' roll by any Russian musician.

Other bands
In the mid-1960s, Gradsky joined the band Slaviane (Славяне – The Slavs) as lead singer. The band's repertoire consisted almost entirely of Beatles and Rolling Stones covers. In 1966–1967, he was working with three bands: Slaviane, Los Panchos and Skify (Скифы – The Scythians). However, he found himself disagreeing with his Slaviane bandmates over the direction the band should take. Gradsky wanted to perform original rock songs in his native Russian language, whereas the other band members did not think that such endeavours could be successful and wanted to continue performing imported songs.

Gradsky consequently decided to form his own band, Skomorokhi (Скоморохи – The Jesters or The Buffoons) in 1967. His band became popular playing original Russian songs, as Gradsky blended elements of Western rock music with the lyric-centred, folk-influenced Russian bard music which was popular around that time. He enrolled in Gnesins Academy of Music in 1969, and continued to perform with Skomorokhi while a student. A successful performance at the Soviet pop-rock festival Silver Strings was followed with airplay and record deals.

Solo career
In 1971, David Tukhmanov invited Gradsky to record some vocal parts for his debut LP How Beautiful is the World. Gradsky performed two songs, one of which ("Once upon a time I was") got critical acclaim. In 1973, film director Andrei Konchalovsky asked Alexander Gradsky to compose and perform music for the film "A Lover's Romance", which was released in 1974, the same year in which Gradsky graduated with a master's degree in vocal performance. Gradsky performed all the male vocal parts in the film soundtrack, which brought him fame as a solo artist. His many records released during his long career encompass a variety of genres. His first rock opera, Stadium (Стадион – Stadion), dedicated to the memory of Víctor Jara, was released as a double LP in 1985.  He also composed a rock ballet The Man (Человек – Chelovek), released in 1988.

Gradsky was a tenor who is reported to have a three-and-a-half octave vocal range, and also played 12 instruments. He performed the demanding role of the Astrologer in Rimsky-Korsakov's opera The Golden Cockerel (Золотой Петушок – Zolotoy Petushok) in Moscow's Bolshoi Theatre in 1988.

{{Quote box
| quote = — You are from Russia, nice to meet you (looks quite apprehensively).What did you like the most from the concert?— I liked the concert very much, and most of all I liked the piecewith variable sizes: 7/8, 9/8 and 11/8. Like in Russian music.— Yes, like Stravinsky.— Yes, as in the "The Rite of Spring".— Yes, as in the third part.— Yes, in allegro.— I know who you are and what you are worth.
| source = A conversation with Sting, from the book "Alexander Gradsky. The Voice"<ref>Dodolev, Е.  Александр Градский. The Голос. — Ripol-classic, 2013. — ISBN 978-5-386-05582-0</ref>
| align = right
| bgcolor = #FFFFF0
| quoted = 
| style=padding:8px;}}

In the 80s, Gradsky returned to the writing a poetry and creating social-themed songs. He formed a concert program in the "singer-songwriter" style. He participated in the organization of a number of Soviet rock festivals such as Rock-panorama. He also worked as a host of "Alexander Gradsky's hit-parade" show on radio "Yunost" showing near 107 artists from different genres (artits like Alexander Bashlachev, Yuri Shevchuk, Victor Tsoy, Konstantin Kinchev, Dmitriy Malikov, Vladimir Presnyakov Jr. got their first radio broadcast). Gradsky took part in  a charity concert for the liquidators of Chernobyl disaster.

Since the late '80s, Gradsky taught vocals at the Gnesin Music Academy and performed there. In 1987, he became a member of Union of Russian Composers.

His collaboration with John Denver, with whom he performed the 1986 song Let us Begin..., brought him to wider international attention. On 16 July 1988 Gradsky performed at the San Francisco, California Golden Gate Park Bandshell as part of the American Soviet Peace Walk Concert. Later that evening he also played acoustic guitar and sang during the intermission (set break) at the Grateful Dead Rex Foundation Charity concert at U.C. Berkeley's Greek Theater. In 1990, he got a contract with Victor Entertainment and released two albums containing songs in Russian and English as well as Japanese romances. In 1999, he performed a recital at New York City's Carnegie Hall.

In late 2009, Alexander Gradsky released a 4-CD opera adaptation of Mikhail Bulgakov's novel The Master and Margarita'' (Ма́стер и Маргари́та), starring Gradsky himself as Master, Woland, Yeshua and Behemoth.
The opera also stars Nikolai Fomenko as Koroviev, Mikhail Seryshev (formerly of Master) as Ivan, and Elena Minina as Margarita, in addition to many renowned Russian singers and actors in episodic roles, including (but not limited to) Iosif Kobzon, Lyubov Kazarnovskaya, Andrei Makarevich, Alexander Rosenbaum, Arkady Arkanov, and the late Georgi Millyar (voice footage from one of his movies was used).

In his later years Gradsky positioned himself as a marginal; he was demanding of his colleagues as well as journalists.

The Voice 
In 2012-2014, he took part in the TV project "The Voice" as a coach along with Dima Bilan, Pelageya and Leonid Agutin. In the first three seasons, the artists from his team won — Dina Garipova, Sergey Volchkov and Alexandra Vorobyova.

He also took part in 2015; his participant, Mikhail Ozerov, took the second place.

In 2017 and 2021 Gradsky, Pelageya, Bilan and Agutin (often described in mass media as a "golden composition") returned into the show once again. In 2017, a participant from Gradsky's team, Selim Alahyarov, has won the competition. In 2021, Alisher Usmanov took the second place.

A significant part of Gradsky's team made up the troupe of the "Gradsky Hall", opened in 2015.

Personal life
Alexander Gradsky was married four times.
His first marriage was when he was in his early twenties but it didn't last long and they divorced within months.
He was married for the second time in 1970 to actress Anastasia Vertinskaya. 
His third marriage was with a then 20 year old Lomonosov Moscow University economics student Olga Fartysheva. They were married for 23 years and had two children together Daniel (March 1981) and Maria (January 1986). 
Alexander was in a relationship with Ukrainian fashion model Marina Kotashenko in his late years, they had two sons together: Alexander (2014) and Ivan (2018).

Death
After contracting COVID-19 in September 2021, amid the COVID-19 pandemic in Russia, Gradsky's health steadily deteriorated. On 26 November 2021, he did not feel well at home, and was urgently hospitalized at a Moscow hospital for a suspected stroke. On 28 November 2021, he died at the age of 72. On 1 December 2021, he was buried at the Vagankovo Cemetery.

Discography

Rock operas

Other albums and EPs

DVDs

References

External links

 
Gradsky's biography 
 

1949 births
2021 deaths
20th-century Russian male singers
20th-century Russian singers
21st-century Russian male singers
21st-century Russian singers
Burials at Vagankovo Cemetery
Deaths from the COVID-19 pandemic in Russia
Gnessin State Musical College alumni
People's Artists of Russia
People from Kopeysk
Russian bards
Russian people of Jewish descent
Russian rock singers
Soviet male singers
Soviet rock music